Literary Taste: How to Form it is a long essay by Arnold Bennett, first published in 1909, with a revised edition by his friend Frank Swinnerton appearing in 1937. It includes a long list of recommended books, every item individually costed.

Both the essay and the list were very influential, although Bennett's decision to include only books originally written in English (along with a handful of Latin works) makes it extremely insular compared with most other attempts at compiling a literary canon.

Outline
 The Aim
 Your Particular Case
 Why a Classic is a Classic
 Where to Begin
 How to Read a Classic (using Charles Lamb's Dream Children)
 The Question of Style
 Wrestling with an Author
 System in Reading
 Verse (Hazlitt's On Poetry in General, Isaiah ch. 40, Wordsworth's The Brothers, E. Browning's Aurora Leigh)
 Broad Counsels

Library
Period IV only appears in the second edition by Swinnerton.

The symbol * denotes first edition only. The symbol † denotes second edition only.

Period I (to 1700)

Prose
 Venerable Bede: Ecclesiastical History (Latin)
 The Paston Letters†
 Hugh Latimer: Sermons†
 Sir Thomas Malory: Morte d'Arthur
 Sir Thomas More: Utopia (Latin)
 George Cavendish: Life of Cardinal Wolsey
 Richard Hakluyt: Voyages
 Richard Hooker: Ecclesiastical Polity
 Francis Bacon: Essays and Advancement of Learning
 Thomas Dekker (poet): The Gul's Horn-Book
 Lord Herbert of Cherbury: Autobiography*
 Thomas Lodge: Rosalynde
 John Selden: Table Talk
 Thomas Hobbes: Leviathan
 James Howell: Familiar Letters
 Sir Thomas Browne: Religio Medici, Urn Burial
 Jeremy Taylor: Holy Living and Holy Dying
 Izaak Walton: The Compleat Angler
 John Bunyan: The Pilgrim's Progress
 Sir William Temple: Essay on Gardens of Epicurus*
 Dorothy Osborne: Letters to Sir William Temple†
 John Evelyn: Diary
 Samuel Pepys: Diary

Poetry
 Beowulf
 Everyman and other Interludes†
 William Langland: Piers Plowman†
 Geoffrey Chaucer
 Nicolas Udall: Ralph Roister Doister
 Edmund Spenser
 Thomas Kyd: The Spanish Tragedy†
 Robert Greene: The Tragical Reign of Selimus
 Michael Drayton
 Christopher Marlowe
 William Shakespeare
 Thomas Campion
 Ben Jonson: plays
 John Donne: poems and sermons
 John Webster, Cyril Tourneur* and John Ford: plays
 Philip Massinger: plays
 Beaumont and Fletcher: plays
 George Herbert: "The Temple"
 Robert Herrick
 Edmund Waller
 Sir John Suckling
 Abraham Cowley*
 Richard Crashaw
 Henry Vaughan
 Samuel Butler: Hudibras
 John Milton: Areopagitica, other essays, and poems
 Andrew Marvell
 John Dryden: Essay of Dramatick Poesie†, and poems
 Thomas Percy: Reliques of Ancient English Poetry (ed.)
 Arber's Anthologies*
 John Marston, plays* (omitted from list because out of print)

Period II (1700-1800)

Prose
 John Locke: Two Treatises of Government
 Sir Isaac Newton: Principia*
 Gilbert Burnet: History of His Own Time
 William Wycherley: plays
 William Congreve
 Jonathan Swift: Gulliver's Travels, The Tale of a Tub; The Battle of the Books†
 Daniel Defoe: Robinson Crusoe, A Journal of the Plague Year
 Joseph Addison and Sir Richard Steele: The Spectator
 William Law: A Serious Call to a Devout and Holy Life
 Colley Cibber: Autobiography†
 Lady Mary Wortley Montagu: Letters
 George Berkeley: A Treatise Concerning the Principles of Human Knowledge
 Samuel Richardson: Clarissa
 John Wesley: Journal
 Henry Fielding: Tom Jones, Amelia, Joseph Andrews
 David Hume: essays
 Laurence Sterne: Tristram Shandy, A Sentimental Journey Through France and Italy
 Horace Walpole: The Castle of Otranto; Letters†
 William Thomas Beckford: Vathek†
 Samuel Johnson: Rasselas, Lives of the Poets
 Tobias Smollett: Humphrey Clinker, Travels through France and Italy
 Adam Smith: The Wealth of Nations
 James Boswell: Life of Johnson
 Oliver Goldsmith
 Henry Mackenzie: The Man of Feeling
 Sir Joshua Reynolds: Discourses on Art
 Edmund Burke: Writings on France, Thoughts on the Present Discontents
 Edward Gibbon: The Decline and Fall of the Roman Empire; Autobiography†
 Thomas Paine: The Rights of Man
 Richard Brinsley Sheridan: plays
 Fanny Burney: Evelina
 Gilbert White: The Natural History and Antiquities of Selborne
 Arthur Young: Travels in France
 Mungo Park: Travels
 Jeremy Bentham: Introduction to the Principles of Morals*
 Thomas Robert Malthus: An Essay on the Principle of Population
 William Godwin: Caleb Williams*
 Maria Edgeworth: Helen
 Jane Austen
 James Morier: Hadji Baba*

Poetry
 Thomas Otway: Venice Preserved
 Matthew Prior: Poems on Several Occasions
 John Gay
 Alexander Pope
 Isaac Watts: hymns
 James Thomson
 Charles Wesley: hymns
 Samuel Johnson
 Oliver Goldsmith
 Thomas Gray
 William Collins
 James Macpherson: Ossian*
 Thomas Chatterton
 William Cowper
 George Crabbe
 William Blake
 William Lisle Bowles*
 Hartley Coleridge*
 Robert Burns

Period III (1800-1900)

Novelists
 Sir Walter Scott: Waverley, The Heart of Midlothian, Quentin Durward, Redgauntlet, Ivanhoe, The Pirate†, The Antiquary†
 Thomas Love Peacock
 Mary Russell Mitford: Our Village
 Michael Scott: Tom Cringle's Log
 Frederick Marryat: The King's Own†, Mr Midshipman Easy
 John Galt: Annals of the Parish, The Ayrshire Legatees
 Susan Ferrier: Marriage
 Douglas William Jerrold: Mrs Caudle's Curtain Lectures*
 Edward Bulwer-Lytton: The Last Days of Pompeii
 Charles Lever: Harry Lorrequer
 Harrison Ainsworth: Rookwood†, The Tower of London
 George Borrow: Lavengro, The Romany Rye†, The Bible in Spain
 Benjamin Disraeli: Sybil, Coningsby
 William Makepeace Thackeray: Vanity Fair, The History of Henry Esmond, The Memoirs of Barry Lyndon, Esq.*, Roundabout Papers*
 Charles Dickens
 Charles Reade: The Cloister and the Hearth
 Anthony Trollope: The Warden†, Barchester Towers, Framley Parsonage, The Last Chronicle of Barset†, Autobiography†
 Charles Kingsley: Westward Ho!
 Henry Kingsley: Ravenshoe
 Charlotte Brontë, Emily Brontë; Anne Brontë†
 Elizabeth Gaskell: Cranford, Mary Barton†, North and South†, The Life of Charlotte Bronte
 George Eliot: Adam Bede, Silas Marner, The Mill on the Floss, Middlemarch†
 George Whyte-Melville: The Gladiators
 George Macdonald: Malcolm*, Sir Gibbie†
 Wilkie Collins: The Woman in White, The Moonstone†
 R. D. Blackmore: Lorna Doone
 Samuel Butler: Erewhon, The Way of All Flesh†, Notebooks†
 Laurence Oliphant: Altiora Peto*
 Margaret Oliphant: Salem Chapel
 Lewis Carroll: Alice's Adventures in Wonderland, Through the Looking-Glass†
 Joseph Henry Shorthouse: John Inglesant
 Robert Louis Stevenson: Kidnapped (novel)†, The Master of Ballantrae, The Merry Men and Other Tales and Fables†, Virginibus Puerisque
 George Gissing: The Odd Women*, Thyrza†, The Private Papers of Henry Ryecroft†

Non-novelists
 Charles Lamb
 Walter Savage Landor: Imaginary Conversations, poems
 Leigh Hunt: Autobiography†, Essays and Sketches
 William Cobbett
 William Hazlitt: Spirit of the Age*, The English Poets, The English Comic Writers, Table Talk†, The Plain Speaker†
 Francis Jeffrey: Essays from The Edinburgh Review
 Thomas de Quincey
 Sydney Smith: Selected Papers*
 George Finlay: Byzantine Empire*
 John G. Lockhart: Life of Scott*
 Agnes Strickland: Life of Queen Elizabeth*
 Hugh Miller: Old Red Sandstone*
 John Henry Newman: Apologia Pro Vita Sua
 Lord Macaulay: History of England, Essays
 A. P. Stanley: Memorials of Canterbury*
 Thomas Carlyle: The French Revolution: A History, Cromwell, Sartor Resartus, Heroes and Hero-Worship, Latter-Day Pamphlets*
 Charles Darwin: The Origin of Species, The Voyage of the Beagle
 Alexander William Kinglake: Eothen
 John Stuart Mill: Auguste Comte and Positivism*; Autobiography†, On Liberty†, Representative Government†
 John Brown: Horae Subsecivae, Rab and his Friends*
 Sir Arthur Helps: Friends in Council*
 Mark Pattison: Life of Milton*
 F. W. Robertson: On Religion and Life*
 Benjamin Jowett: Interpretation of Scripture*
 Alexander Smith: Dreamthorpe
 Mary Wollstonecraft: A Vindication of the Rights of Women
 George Henry Lewes: Principles of Success in Literature*, Life of Goethe†
 Alexander Bain: Mind and Body
 James Anthony Froude: Short Studies on Great Subjects
 John Tyndall: Glaciers of the Alps
 Sir Henry Maine: Ancient Law
 John Ruskin: Seven Lamps of Architecture, Sesame and Lilies, The Stones of Venice
 Herbert Spencer: First Principles, Essays on Education
 Sir Richard Francis Burton: Narrative of a Pilgrimage to Mecca*, First Footsteps in East Africa†
 John Hanning Speke: Sources of the Nile
 Thomas Henry Huxley: Man's Place in Nature, Lectures and Lay Sermons
 E. A. Freeman: Europe*
 William Stubbs: Early Plantagenets*
 Winwood Reade: The Martyrdom of Man†
 Walter Bagehot: Lombard Street*, Literary Studies†
 Walter Pater: Imaginary Portraits, Marius the Epicurean
 Richard Holt Hutton: Cardinal Newman*
 Richard Jefferies: The Story of My Heart†
 Sir John Seeley: Ecce Homo
 David Masson: Thomas de Quincey*
 Sir George Trevelyan, 2nd Baronet: Life of Macaulay†
 John Richard Green: A Short History of the English People
 Sir Leslie Stephen: Pope*
 Lord Acton: On the Study of History*
 Mandell Creighton: 'The Age of Elizabeth*
 Oscar Wilde†
 F. W. H. Myers: Wordsworth*, Human Personality and its Survival of Bodily Death†
 Mark Rutherford: Pages from a Journal†

Poets
 William Wordsworth
 Sir Walter Scott
 Robert Southey
 Samuel Taylor Coleridge
 John Keats
 Percy Bysshe Shelley
 Lord Byron
 Thomas Hood
 James and Horace Smith: Rejected Addresses John Keble: The Christian Year George Darley
 Thomas Lovell Beddoes
 Thomas Moore
 James Clarence Mangan
 Winthrop Mackworth Praed
 Robert Stephen Hawker: Cornish Ballads Edward FitzGerald: Rubaiyat of Omar Khayyam P. J. Bailey: Festus*
 Arthur Hugh Clough
 Lord Tennyson
 Robert Browning and Elizabeth Barrett Browning
 P. B. Marston: Song-tide*
 Aubrey Thomas de Vere: Legends of St Patrick*
 Matthew Arnold: poems and essays
 Coventry Patmore
 Sydney Dobell*
 Eric Mackay: Love-letters of a Violinist*
 T. E. Brown
 C. S. Calverley: Verses, Translations and Fly-Leaves
 Edward Lear: A Book of Nonsense†
 D. G. Rossetti
 Christina Rossetti: "Goblin Market"
 James Thomson: "The City of Dreadful Night"
 Jean Ingelow
 William Morris
 Augusta Webster*
 Gerard Manley Hopkins†
 W. E. Henley
 Francis Thompson

Period IV (1900-1935)†

Novelists and dramatists
 George Meredith: The Ordeal of Richard Feverel, The Egoist, Evan Harrington, An Essay on Comedy, poems
 Thomas Hardy: The Dynasts, Far from the Madding Crowd, Jude the Obscure, The Return of the Native, Tess of the D'Urbervilles, poems
 Rudyard Kipling: The Jungle Book, Just So Stories, Plain Tales from the Hills, Many Inventions, The Day's Work, Soldiers Three, Barrack-Room Ballads Henry James: Daisy Miller, The Spoils of Poynton, The Ambassadors George Moore: Confessions of a Young Man, Esther Waters, The Brook Kerith George Bernard Shaw: Plays Pleasant, Plays Unpleasant, Man and Superman, Saint Joan, The Apple Cart Joseph Conrad: The Mirror of the Sea, Lord Jim, Youth J. M. Barrie: The Admirable Crichton, Dear Brutus, Margaret Ogilvy, A Widow in Thrums Allan Monkhouse: Mary Broome Arthur Conan Doyle: The Adventures of Sherlock Holmes W. W. Jacobs: Many Cargoes H. G. Wells: The Time Machine, The Wheels of Chance, Short Stories, Tono-Bungay, The History of Mr Polly Arnold Bennett: The Old Wives' Tale, Lord Raingo, Books and Persons, The Truth about an Author John Galsworthy: The Forsyte Saga, plays
 Somerset Maugham: Of Human Bondage, Ashenden, The Gentleman in the Parlour, plays (The Circle, The Constant Wife, The Bread-Winner)
 Elizabeth von Arnim: Vera Kenneth Grahame: The Wind in the Willows Saki: The Unbearable Bassington J. M. Synge: The Playboy of the Western World Harley Granville-Barker: Waste, The Voysey Inheritance Stanley Houghton: Hindle Wakes St. John Greer Ervine: The Wayward Man, John Ferguson A. A. Milne: Second Plays, The Day's Play P. G. Wodehouse: The Inimitable Jeeves, Meet Mr Mulliner Oliver Onions: In Accordance with the Evidence J. D. Beresford: The Hampdenshire Wonder Henry Handel Richardson: Maurice Guest E. M. Forster: Howards End Compton Mackenzie: Carnival Hugh Walpole: The Dark Forest Francis Brett Young: Portrait of Clare D. H. Lawrence: Sons and Lovers, The Rainbow, Tales, Fantasia of the Unconscious, poems
 Katherine Mansfield: The Garden Party Wyndham Lewis: Tarr Virginia Woolf: Mrs Dalloway, The Common Reader Naomi Mitchison: The Conquered R. H. Mottram: The Spanish Farm J. B. Priestley: Angel Pavement, plays
 Stella Benson: The Little World Charles Langbridge Morgan: Portrait in a Mirror Aldous Huxley: Little Mexican, Brave New World, Jesting Pilate, stories, essays, poems
 David Garnett: Lady into Fox, A Man in the Zoo Henry Williamson: Tarka the Otter L. A. G. Strong: Tuesday Afternoons Evelyn Waugh: Decline and Fall Denis Johnston: The Moon in the Yellow River Seán O'Casey: Five Irish Plays
 Norah Hoult: Poor Women H. E. Bates: Thirty TalesOther prose
 C. M. Doughty: Travels in Arabia Deserta W. H. Hudson: El Ombú, Birds and Men Morley Roberts: The Western Avernus Norman Douglas: South Wind, Old Calabria R. B. Cunninghame Graham: Rodeo, Mogreb el-Acksa Apsley Cherry-Garrard: The Worst Journey in the World David Bone: The Brassbounder H. M. Tomlinson: The Sea and the Jungle, Norman Douglas C. E. Montague: Disenchantment, Fiery Particles Havelock Ellis: Selected Essays
 Graham Wallas: Human Nature in Politics G. Lowes Dickinson: A Modern Symposium W. R. Inge: Outspoken Essays Bertrand Russell: What I Believe, On Education, Roads to Freedom Alfred North Whitehead: Science and the Modern World Arthur Stanley Eddington: The Nature of the Physical World Hilaire Belloc: The Path to Rome, The Servile State, The Mercy of Allah, A Picked Company (picked by E. V. Lucas)
 G. K. Chesterton: The Flying Inn, Charles Dickens, The Victorian Age in Literature, Autobiography, stories, essays, poems
 Maurice Baring: Lost Diaries W. N. P. Barbellion: The Journal of a Disappointed Man Lytton Strachey: Queen Victoria Max Beerbohm
 Sir Edmund Gosse: Father and Son Arthur Machen: Far Off Things Arthur Quiller-Couch: On the Art of Reading Alfred George Gardiner: Windfalls E. V. Lucas: Loiterers' Harvest, The Gentlest Art (ed.)
 Percy Lubbock: Earlham Robert Lynd: Books and AuthorsPoets
 Algernon Charles Swinburne
 W. B. Yeats
 Lord Alfred Douglas
 Robert Bridges
 William Watson
 A. E. Housman
 George William Russell ("A. E.")
 John Davidson
 Alice Meynell
 Laurence Binyon
 Gordon Bottomley
 W. H. Davies
 Walter de la Mare
 John Masefield
 Ralph Hodgson
 Edward Thomas
 Wilfrid Wilson Gibson
 James Stephens
 Lascelles Abercrombie
 John Drinkwater
 Rupert Brooke
 Charlotte Mew: The Farmer's Bride James Elroy Flecker
 Wilfred Owen
 J. C. Squire
 Edmund Blunden: Undertones of War W. J. Turner: In Times Like Glass, Jack and Jill, Blow for Balloons Robert Graves
 Siegfried Sassoon
 Robert Nichols: Ardours and Endurances Edith Sitwell
 Osbert Sitwell: Argonaut and Juggernaut Sacheverell Sitwell: The 101 Harlequins T. S. Eliot
 James Joyce: Chamber Music, Dubliners, Portrait of the Artist as a Young Man Richard Church: News from the Mountain Roy Campbell: Adamastor W. H. Auden: The Dance of Death, The Ascent of F6 (with Christopher Isherwood)
 Cecil Day-Lewis
 Louis MacNeice
 Christopher Hassall: Devil's Dyke and Other PoemsAppendix (Penguin edition)
The Penguin edition of 1938 included an appendix of books they were offering in paperback for sixpence a volume. Those not already appearing above were:
 W. H. Hudson: The Purple Land George Bernard Shaw: Back to Methuselah, The Intelligent Woman's Guide to Socialism, Capitalism, Sovietism, and Fascism Alfred North Whitehead: Science and the Modern World Roger Fry: Vision and Design Olaf Stapledon: Last and First Men W. W. Jacobs: Deep Waters G. K. Chesterton: The Man Who Was Thursday E. C. Bentley: Trent's Last Case P. G. Wodehouse: My Man Jeeves E. M. Forster: A Passage to India Hugh Walpole: Mr Perrin and Mr Traill Francis Brett Young: The Crescent Moon Aldous Huxley: Crome Yellow Osbert Sitwell: Before the Bombardment''

External links

 Literary Taste: How to Form It at Internet Archive, Project Gutenberg and Google Books (scanned books, text, HTML and other formats)

1909 essays
1909 books
Self-help books
1957 essays
Books by Arnold Bennett